Brotherhood is a Nigerian crime-action thriller produced by Jade Osiberu and starring Tobi Bakre, Boma Akpore, Falz, Basketmouth, Sam Dede, Ronke Oshodi Oke, Toni Tones, Zubby Micheal, Mr Macaroni and a host of others. The film was released to cinemas in Africa on 23 September 2022. The film started showing simultaneously in several African countries including Nigeria, Cameroon, Benin Republic, Burkina Faso, Togo, Niger Republic, Senegal, Congo, Rwanda, Gabon, Guinea, and Madagascar.

Synopsis 
Brotherhood tells a story of twin brothers Wale Adetula (played by Falz) and Akin Adetula (played by Tobi Bakre) who saw their parents being killed while they were young. Growing up the twin brothers find themselves on opposite sides of a coin as Wale joins the Police SWAT team while Akin becomes a criminal which landed him in prison severally. After Akin is released from the prison, he joins the notorious 'Ojuju Boys' and brings about plans to help them rob bullion vans and banks.
Their first operation was successful and they sought to continue on a bigger operation which Akin Adetula didn't want to be a part of at first, but later joined.
On the operation, the SWAT team which Wale Adetula happens to be a part of, is deployed and blocks their escape. Both parties shoot it out on the scene and most of the Ojuju boys get killed. 
One of the Ojuju Boys and Akin's greedy friend, Izra (OC Ukeje) decides to betray them, escaping with the money.
Akin's lover and only female member of the gang, Goldie (Toni Tones) gets killed in an attempt by she and Akin to escape.
Akin is confronted by Wale who behs to take him in. 
Akin is shot by the police and falls from the bridge into the Lagoon.
Divers are deployed to the Lagoon but Akin's body is never recovered. Wale is taken into custody by Internal Affairs, investigated for his possible connection with his brother and the Ojuju Boys.
Izra reaches the smuggler to escape with the loot, claiming he is the only survivor of the heist.
Akin finds and kills him before he is able to abscond the country with the loot.
The movie ends with Akin calling Wale —who is at the end of his suspension by Internal Affairs 
—with an unknown number from Togo.

Cast 

 Tobi Bakre as Akin Adetula
 Falz as Wale Adetula
 Basketmouth as Shadow
 Mr Macaroni as Adura
 Sam Dede as Officer Daniel
 Toni Tones as Goldie
 Oc Ukeje as Izra
 Ronke Oshodi Oke
 Dorathy Bachor as Kamsi
 Boma Akpore as Sanusi
 Seyi Awolowo
 Omawunmi
 Dianne Russet
 Zubby Micheal
 Swanky JKA

Production and release 
Brotherhood was shot in Lagos, Nigeria, and was co-written by Jade Osiberu and Abdul Tijani-Ahmed. It was directed by Ugandan director, Loukman Ali. Following the release of Brotherhood, Adebola Williams chairman of AW Network who also doubles as an Executive Producer for the film stated that 'Brotherhood will usher in a new era of fearless filmmaking in the African film industry' also went further to state that AW Network has also partnered with Jade Osiberu to push the frontiers of storytelling. Brotherhood was premiered on 16th, September 2022 in Lagos at Jewel Aeida. The premiere was sponsored by Fearless drink brand. The theme of the premiere was 'Ojuju' as invitees all dressed in accordance to the theme, Riquesa Africa also joined the premiere by celebrating the best-dressed celebrities with two-million naira gift. Some celebrities and personalities present for the premiere are Mercy Aigbe, Bisola Aiyeola, Dorathy Bachor, Ifu Ennada, Prince Nelson, Alex Unusual, Pretty Mike, Elozonam, Priscilla Ajoke Ojo, Enioluwa Adeoluwa and others.

References 

2022 films
Nigerian crime thriller films